The Reed Gold Mine is located in Midland, Cabarrus County, North Carolina, and is the site of the first documented commercial gold find in the United States.  It has been designated a National Historic Landmark because of its importance and listed on the National Register of Historic Places

History

In 1799, Conrad Reed, the son of farmer and former Hessian soldier John Reed (né Johannes Reidt) born June 6, 1757, found a 17-pound yellow "rock" in Little Meadow Creek on the family farm in Cabarrus County, North Carolina.  For three years, the rock served as a bulky doorstop. In 1802, a jeweler from Fayetteville identified the rock as a large gold nugget.  He told John Reed to name his price.  Reed, not understanding the true value of gold, asked for what he thought was the hefty price of $3.50, or a week's worth of wages.  The large nugget's true value was around $3,600.

About 1803, John Reed organized a small gold mining operation. Soon afterward a slave named Peter found a 28-pound nugget.  Reed continued with placer mining for a number of years.  In 1831 he began underground mining.  John Reed died at age 88 on May 28, 1845, rich from the gold found on his property.

Some years later, the American Civil War decreased mining activity because of labor and resources being pulled into the war. The last large nugget uncovered by placer mining was discovered in 1896.  The last underground mining took place at the Reed Mine in 1912.  To handle the large amount of gold found in the region and state from the 19th into the early 20th century, the Charlotte Mint was built in nearby Charlotte, North Carolina.

Today, the Reed Mine is a state historic site that belongs to the North Carolina Department of Natural and Cultural Resources and open to the public. Visitors can tour a museum with extensive displays about North Carolina gold mining.  In addition, they can explore several hundred feet of restored gold mine tunnels.

About John Reed

Johannes Reith, a Hessian soldier from Raboldshausen, Germany, served during the American Revolution in Company C (Col. Friedrich von Porbeck) of the Garrison Regiment von Wissenbach.  On June 21, 1782 he deserted his post outside Savannah, Georgia and took his arms and equipment. He left the British army and came to settle in the lower part of North Carolina.

He went to 'upper' Mecklenburg County, North Carolina, later Cabarrus County, where he settled in the ethnic German community.  He Anglicized his name to John Reed.  Later he married Sarah Kiser, daughter of Peter Kiser and Fanny Garmon.

See also
Carolina Gold Rush
Georgia Gold Rush
List of National Historic Landmarks in North Carolina
National Register of Historic Places listings in Cabarrus County, North Carolina

References

External links

Reed Gold Mine - official site
American Society of Mechanical Engineers History & Heritage Landmarks Page

Industrial buildings and structures on the National Register of Historic Places in North Carolina
Protected areas of Cabarrus County, North Carolina
Geology of North Carolina
Gold mines in the United States
Gold rushes
National Historic Landmarks in North Carolina
1799 establishments in North Carolina
Surface mines in the United States
Museums in Cabarrus County, North Carolina
Historic districts on the National Register of Historic Places in North Carolina
Mining museums in North Carolina
Industry museums in North Carolina
Mines in North Carolina
North Carolina State Historic Sites
National Register of Historic Places in Cabarrus County, North Carolina
Open-air museums in North Carolina